Darsalam, Dar Salam or various forms of the spelling may refer to tens of settlements in Africa.

Burkina Faso
Darsalam, Balé
Darsalam, Ganzourgou
Darsalam, Gnagna
Darsalam, Solenzo
Darsalam, Tansila

Comoros
Darsalam, Comoros

Guinea
Dar Salam, Kindia
Dar Salam. Dubreka 
Dar Salam, Kankan